Eliana Cuevas is a Canadian jazz singer, whose music blends jazz with Latin music. She is most noted for her album Golpes y Flores, for which she won the Canadian Folk Music Award for World Solo Artist of the Year at the 14th Canadian Folk Music Awards in 2018.

Born and raised in Caracas, Venezuela, she moved to Canada in 1996 and is currently based in Toronto, Ontario.

Discography
Cohesion (2002)
Ventura (2004)
Vidas (2007)
Luna Llena (2009)
Espejo (2013)
Golpes y Flores (2017)

References

External links

Canadian women jazz singers
Canadian world music musicians
Spanish-language singers of Canada
Musicians from Caracas
Musicians from Toronto
Venezuelan emigrants to Canada
Living people
21st-century Canadian women singers
Canadian Folk Music Award winners
Year of birth missing (living people)